The 13th Golden Bell Awards was held on 26 March 1977 at the Armed Forces Cultural Center in Taipei, Taiwan. The ceremony was hosted by Ting Mao-shih.

Winners

References

1977
1977 in Taiwan